Parson Creek is a stream in Sullivan, Linn and Livingston counties of the U.S. state of Missouri. It is a tributary of the Grand River.

The stream flows south parallel to Missouri Route DD passing under Missouri Route MM and enters Linn County approximately six miles east of Browning. The stream continues to the south roughly parallel to Missouri Route 139 passing the communities of Shafter and Hecla. It crosses under Route 139 and Missouri Route B 6.5 miles west of Linneus. It continues south passing one mile west of Meadville and crosses under US Route 36.

According to tradition, Parson Creek was named for an incident in which a parson drowned in its swollen waters.

See also
List of rivers of Missouri

References

Rivers of Linn County, Missouri
Rivers of Livingston County, Missouri
Rivers of Sullivan County, Missouri
Rivers of Missouri